George Washington II: The Forging of a Nation is a 1986 television film, and was the sequel to the 1984 miniseries George Washington. The film chronicles the life of George Washington, the first President of the United States. George Washington II: The Forging of a Nation is based on the biography by James Thomas Flexner.

It aired on September 21–22, 1986.
The two-part sequel received low television ratings, among the worst ratings received by a miniseries to that time.  It nevertheless received two nominations during the 39th Primetime Emmy Awards for Best Make-up and Best Hairstyling.

Cast
Barry Bostwick as George Washington – Commander-in-Chief of the Continental Army, and later first President of the United States
Patty Duke Astin as Martha Washington – Wife of George Washington
Jeffrey Jones as Thomas Jefferson 
Richard Bekins as Alexander Hamilton 
Penny Fuller as Eliza Powel
Eve Gordon as Elizabeth Schuyler Hamilton
Marcia Cross as Anne Bingham 
Guy Paul as James Madison 
Norman Snow as Edmund Randolph
Lise Hilboldt as Maria Reynolds 
Haviland Morris as Henrietta Liston
Daniel Davis as Patrick Henry 
Richard Fancy as William Duer
Farnham Scott as Henry Knox
Nicholas Kepros as John Jay

See also
 We Fight to Be Free (2006 film)
 Washington (2020 miniseries)
 List of television series and miniseries about the American Revolution
 List of films about the American Revolution

References

External links
 

1986 television films
1986 films
American television films
Cultural depictions of George Washington
Cultural depictions of Thomas Jefferson
Cultural depictions of Alexander Hamilton
Cultural depictions of Patrick Henry
Cultural depictions of James Madison
Films set in the 18th century
Television films about the American Revolution
Television films based on books
Films directed by William Graham (director)
Films scored by Bruce Broughton
Cultural depictions of Martha Washington